Ochtozetus is a genus of ground beetles in the family Carabidae. There are two described species in Ochtozetus, found in South America.

Species
These two species belong to the genus Ochtozetus:
 Ochtozetus bicolor (Brullé, 1838)  (Argentina, Brazil, and Uruguay)
 Ochtozetus inexspectatus Bousquet & Laplante, 1997  (Brazil)

References

Trechinae